is a Japanese visual kei rock band formed in 2014. Members Chizuru and Minpha started the limited time band 'Call Me ...' as a two-member unit, with Taku on guitar and Atsuki on drums. After 13 December 2014, Atsuki and Taku became official members and Yutori was added to the band.

In February, 2015, the band released their debut album titled, Call Me. On April 29, 2015, their debut single, titled "Shōnen Waltz" was released. On July 24, 2019, the band announced it would stop activities in February 2020.

Members
 Chizuru (千吊) – vocals
 Taku (拓) – guitar
 Yutori (ゆとり) – guitar
 Minpha (眠花) – bass
 Atsuki (篤輝) – drums

Discography

Albums

Studio albums

Mini-albums

Singles

Notes

References

External links
 

2014 establishments in Japan
Japanese nu metal musical groups
Musical groups established in 2014
Visual kei musical groups